Radosav Aleksić (Serbian: Радосав Алексић; born 6 March 1986) is a Serbian footballer who plays for FK Trayal Kruševac in his home country.

Career
Aleksić started his senior career with FK Napredak Kruševac in the Serbian SuperLiga, where he made over twelve league appearances and scored zero goals. After that, he played for FK Radnički 1923, FK Slavija Sarajevo, HŠK Zrinjski Mostar, NK Travnik, FK Krupa, FK Radnik Bijeljina, FK Andijon, and FK Trayal Kruševac, where he now plays.

References

External links
 Aleksic successfully finished the episode in Uzbekistan: I would like to stay abroad a little longer
 Radoslav Aleksic: "I will never forget Andijan fans"
 Aleksic in Uzbekistan: Because of challenges, but also money
 Aleksic: I will remember the goal on Kosevo while I am alive
 Radosav Aleksić: A worker is a new challenge in his career

1986 births
Living people
Serbian footballers
FK Napredak Kruševac players
FK Andijon players
FK Radnik Bijeljina players
FK Radnički 1923 players
FK Slavija Sarajevo players
HŠK Zrinjski Mostar players
NK Travnik players
FK Krupa players
Association football defenders